With Love is the debut studio album by American recording artist Christina Grimmie and the only studio album to be released during her lifetime. The album was released on August 6, 2013. It was announced through her YouTube channel. To support the album, Grimmie embarked as one of the opening acts on Selena Gomez's Stars Dance Tour on USA and Canadian dates.

While the album was made independently, Maker Music handles the internet sales worldwide.

Singles
"Tell My Mama" serves as the album's lead single, sent for airplay exclusively to Radio Disney on August 4, 2013. On August 8, Grimmie performed the song for Seventeen magazine. The music video of the song premiered exclusively on Billboard. It was directed by David Turvey. Grimmie says the song is "about a guy that I start liking in school, and he's sort of a dangerous kid, and I am the type of girl that tells my mom about everything". She sang the song in On Air with Ryan Seacrest with "Think of You" and "Over Overthinking You".

"Feelin' Good" is the second single of the album. The music video for the song was released on April 11, 2014 and features footage from fans.

Critical reception
Critic of Music's review was positive, giving the album a B−, and saying that, "overall, a massive improvement from Find Me, but there is still work to be done."

Track listing

Chart performance

Release history

References

2013 debut albums
Christina Grimmie albums
Pop albums by American artists